Zhang Ruonan (born 14 November 1996)  is a Chinese actress.

Biography 
In 2018, Zhang made her acting debut in the melodrama film Cry Me a Sad River by Guo Jingming, and rose to fame for her role as Gu Senxiang. The same year, she made her small-screen debut in the romance drama Everyone Wants to Meet You produced by Zhao Wei.

In 2019, Zhang starred in her first historical drama Love is All as a female detective.
The same year, she reunited with Guo Jingming in the fantasy romance film The End of Endless Love.

In 2020, Zhang is set to star in the military drama The Glory of Youth. She is also set to star in the fantasy film Onmyoji directed by Guo Jingming.

Filmography

Film

Television series

Awards and nominations

References 

1996 births
Living people
Actresses from Wenzhou
21st-century Chinese actresses
Chinese film actresses
Chinese television actresses